Earth vs the Wildhearts is the debut studio album by British rock band The Wildhearts, released in 1993. The title is based on such B-movie titles as Earth vs. the Flying Saucers and Earth vs. the Spider.

The album has been reissued twice: first in 1994 with the addition of the formerly single-only track "Caffeine Bomb", and again in 2010 with several B-sides from the period.

Recording
Mick Ronson contributed one of the three guitar solos on "My Baby Is a Headfuck". This is believed to be Ronson's final appearance on record before his death on 29 April 1993. "We had the song 'My Baby Is a Headfuck' and it wasn't that great," recalled Ginger, "but we thought, 'If we can get Ronson to play a solo on it, then it'll work'… And Ronson wasn't around for very long, but I take solace in that it was the last of his recordings you got to hear… We got him to do one more take of the song because we didn't want him to stop playing. He nailed it the first time; we just wanted to listen to him."

Sarah Cutts and Stevie Lange guested on the album at the request of the band, who wished to have a member of Cardiacs and the woman who sang the jingle for the 1990s Bodyform advert.

The breakdown on "My Baby Is a Headfuck" uses the riff from the Beatles' "Day Tripper".

Reception and legacy

Earth vs the Wildhearts was voted the best album of 1993 by Kerrang! magazine in their yearly poll. In 2006, Kerrang! rated it #20 in a special publication of the best Rock Albums. Billy Morrison of Camp Freddy and Circus Diablo states that Earth vs the Wildhearts is one of his favourite albums of all time.

On the 15th anniversary of the album's release, in 2008, the Wildhearts toured, playing the original version of the album in its entirety. On its 20th anniversary, in 2013, the Wildhearts reformed for a tour in which the original version of the album was played in its entirety nightly, followed by a second set of songs chosen by the audience. One of the gigs on that tour, at Rock City in Nottingham, was recorded for the 2014 live album, Rock City vs The Wildhearts. In 2018, the band went on a short tour playing the album in full, for its 25th anniversary.

Track listing

Personnel 
Credits adapted from liner notes.

The Wildhearts
 Ginger – vocals, guitar
 C. J. – guitar, vocals
 Danny McCormack – bass
 Stidi – drums

Additional musicians
 Willie Dowling – piano, keyboards
 Ritch Battersby – drums on "Caffeine Bomb"
 Stevie Lange – backing vocals on "Loveshit"
 Mick Ronson – guitar solo on "My Baby Is a Headfuck"
 Sarah Smith – saxophone on "Greetings from Shitsville"

Production
 The Wildhearts – production
 Mike "Spike" Drake – mixing, production
 Ted Jensen – mastering
 KK – engineering
 Mark Dodson – engineering, mixing and production on "Suckerpunch"
 Simon Efemey – production on "Caffeine Bomb"
 Ian Huffam – engineering on "Suckerpunch"

References

External links
[ The Wildhearts: Biography] on AllMusic

DO ANYTHING: The Life and Times of the Wildhearts

The Wildhearts albums
1993 albums
East West Records albums
Bronze Records albums